Romain Mancinelli (born 19 June 1959) is a retired Luxembourg Army general. On 1 December 2014, he became Luxembourg's Chief of Defence, the professional head of the country's military, replacing former chief of defence General Mario Daubenfeld. He retired on 29 September 2017.

He graduated in 1982 from the École Royale Militaire (ERM) in Brussels.

Decorations and awards 
 Commander, Order of Merit of the Grand Duchy of Luxembourg
 25 Years Service Cross
 Croix d'Honneur et de Mérite Militaire in Bronze
 Prince Jean de Luxembourg Commemorative Medal
 Commander, Order of the Oak Crown
 Officer, Order of Adolphe of Nassau

References

External links 
 Biography of Romain Mancinelli at NATO site.
 Biography of Romain Mancinelli on Luxembourg Army site.
 Biography of Romain Mancinelli on Luxembourg Army site. 
This article incorporates text from the corresponding article in the German Wikipedia.

This article incorporates text from the corresponding article in the Luxembourgian Wikipedia.
 
Luxembourgian soldiers
1959 births
Living people